Piletocera chloronota is a moth in the family Crambidae. It was described by Edward Meyrick in 1889. It is found on New Guinea.

References

chloronota
Moths described in 1889
Moths of New Guinea